"Sobredosis" is a song recorded by American singer Romeo Santos, featuring Puerto Rican singer Ozuna. It is the fourh single from Santos' third studio album album Golden. The song won Tropical Song of the year at the 2019 Billboard Latin Music Awards.

Music video 
The music video was originally released on February 13, 2018. It features Santos and Ozuna going to therapy while recounting their respective sexual encounters, before coming face-to-face with their former lovers as they depart. In a sudden twist, the female therapist enters Santos' car and he happily drives her elsewhere. However, It was removed from YouTube do to how explicit the video was. It was re-edited and re-released on February 21, 2018.

Charts

Weekly charts

Year-end charts

Certifications

References

2017 songs
2018 singles
Romeo Santos songs
Ozuna (singer) songs
Songs written by Romeo Santos